Doppelgänger is the second studio album from American mathcore band the Fall of Troy, which followed up the band's bootlegged Ghostship Demos EP from 2004 as well as their self-titled LP from 2003. Four of the songs ("I Just Got This Symphony Goin'", "F.C.P.R.E.M.I.X.", "Mouths Like Sidewinder Missiles", "Whacko Jacko Steals the Elephant Man's Bones") were re-recorded versions of tracks from the self-titled album, hence the name Doppelgänger. "Macaulay McCulkin" was taken from the Ghostship Demos EP, and was put onto Doppelgänger for unknown reasons.

Track listing

Personnel
Tim Ward – bass, vocals
Thomas Erak – guitar, vocals, keys
Andrew Forsman – drums, percussion (credited as "see through drums" in the liners on the original CD release)
Barett Jones – production, engineering, mixing
Ed Brooks – mastering
Heidi Alayne – artwork
Andy Myers – layout
Aya Sato – photography

References

The Fall of Troy albums
2005 albums
Equal Vision Records albums